Undefeated is a 2003 HBO television film directed by John Leguizamo and starring John Leguizamo.

Storyline
This film follows a boxer who climbs the ranks as a featherweight fighter who has never lost a match. The story starts in Queens, New York with Leguizamo training and then fighting in a Golden Gloves boxing match. When his brother who owned a convenience store dies, he is faced with the decision of never boxing again. He soon turns pro and goes to win the championship bout. Quickly the champ struggles with success, entourage, and relationships with his girlfriend as well as his manager.

Cast
 John Leguizamo as Lex Vargas
 Clifton Collins Jr. as Loco
 Adrian Martinez as Chewey
 Juan Carlos Hernández as Franky 
 Nestor Serrano as Victor
 Coati Mundi as Old man
 David Zayas as Paulie
 Guillermo Díaz as Manny (as Guillermo Diaz)
 Omar Benson Miller as Mack
 Vanessa Ferlito as Lizette Sanchez
 Robert Montano as Resto
 Robert Forster as Scott Green
 Kim Matulova as Alva
 Will Arnett as Scott Green's Assistant
 Kamar de los Reyes as Jose Beveagua
 Larry Merchant as Himself
 Jim Lampley as Himself
 Mike Francesa as Mike and the Mad Dog (as Michael Francesa)
 Christopher "Mad Dog" Russo as Mike and the Mad Dog (as Christopher Russo)
 Tony Touch as DJ

References

External links
 

2000s sports drama films
American boxing films
HBO Films films
American sports drama films
2003 television films
2003 films
2003 drama films
2000s English-language films
2000s American films